Xiangtan (531) is a Type 054A frigate of the People's Liberation Army Navy. She was commissioned on 24 February 2016.

Development and design 

The Type 054A carries HQ-16 medium-range air defence missiles and anti-submarine missiles in a vertical launching system (VLS) system. The HQ-16 has a range of up to 50 km, with superior range and engagement angles to the Type 054's HQ-7. The Type 054A's VLS uses a hot launch method; a shared common exhaust system is sited between the two rows of rectangular launching tubes.

The four AK-630 close-in weapon systems (CIWS) of the Type 054 were replaced with two Type 730 CIWS on the Type 054A. The autonomous Type 730 provides improved reaction time against close-in threats.

Construction and career 
Xiangtan was launched on 19 March 2015 at the China State Shipbuilding Corporation in Shanghai. Commissioned on 24 February 2016.

On 22 May 2022, the Xiangtan conducted drills in the East China Sea as a part of the Liaoning Carrier Group; and they were sighted near Miyako Island by the JMSDF.

Gallery

References 

2015 ships
Ships built in China
Type 054 frigates